Ischnocampa huigra is a moth of the family Erebidae. It was described by William Schaus in 1933. It is found in Ecuador.

References

Ischnocampa
Moths described in 1933